Rupsi Airfield is a former wartime United States Army Air Forces airfield in Dhubri, Assam, India used during World War II. It is now abandoned.

References

 Maurer, Maurer. Air Force Combat Units Of World War II. Maxwell Air Force Base, Alabama: Office of Air Force History, 1983. 
www.pacificwrecks.com – Hathazari keyword search

External links

Airfields of the United States Army Air Forces in British India
Defunct airports in India
Airports in Assam
Airports established in 1943
1943 establishments in India
20th-century architecture in India